Peter John Daley II (August 8, 1950 – June 1, 2022) was an American politician who was a Democratic member of the Pennsylvania House of Representatives, representing the 49th Legislative District until 2016. Daley decided to retire and not seek an 18th term in 2016. His district included portions of Fayette County and Washington County.

Biography
Daley was born in Brownsville, Pennsylvania, and graduated from California Area High School in 1968. He earned a Bachelor of Science degree in social studies from California University of Pennsylvania in 1972, and then taught at California Area High School for seven years. He was a delegate to the 1972 Democratic National Convention and served as chair of the Washington Young Democrats (1972–75).

In 1973, at age 22, Daley was elected mayor of California Borough. He served in that position until he was elected to the Pennsylvania House of Representatives in 1982.

From 2009 to 2011, Daley served as the Pennsylvania House of Representatives Commerce Committee Democratic Chairperson. In 2009-10, he also served on the Game & Fisheries Committee and the Intergovernmental Affairs Committee.

Daley served as the Democratic Chair of the Pennsylvania House of Representatives Consumer Affairs Committee in 2013 to 2016.

Daley announced that he would retire from his position on January 7, 2016.

Daley died on June 1, 2022 in California, Pennsylvania. An announcement by Pennsylvania Governor Tom Wolf was made on June 2, 2022, that all flags on Commonwealth facilities, public buildings, and grounds fly at half-staff immediately.

References

External links
Pennsylvania House of Representatives - Peter Daley (Democrat) official PA House website
Pennsylvania House Democratic Caucus - Peter Daley  official Party website

1950 births
2022 deaths
21st-century American politicians
California University of Pennsylvania alumni
Mayors of places in Pennsylvania
Democratic Party members of the Pennsylvania House of Representatives
Pennsylvania lawyers
People from Brownsville, Pennsylvania
People from California, Pennsylvania